Verminnen may refer to:

Johan Verminnen (born 1951), Flemish singer
11846 Verminnen, main-belt minor planet